Kent Skovsager (born 3 August 1970) is a Danish rower. He competed in the men's eight event at the 1992 Summer Olympics.

References

1970 births
Living people
Danish male rowers
Olympic rowers of Denmark
Rowers at the 1992 Summer Olympics